John Fabian Witt is Allen H. Duffy Class of 1960 Professor of Law at Yale Law School. He is the author of Lincoln’s Code: The Laws of War in American History, which won the 2013 Bancroft Prize in history of the Americas and, in 2020, American Contagions: Epidemics and the Law from Smallpox to COVID-19.

Biography
Witt received his B.A., his J.D., and his Ph.D, all from Yale. In 2001, he was awarded the John Addison Porter Prize for "The Accidental Republic: Amputee Workingmen, Destitute Widows, and the Remaking of American Law, 1866-1922." Before returning to teach at Yale, he was the George Welwood Murray Professor of Legal History at Columbia University. In 2007, he criticized the historical basis of John Yoo's theories.  In April 2017, Witt was named the head of Davenport College, one of Yale's 14 residential colleges.

References

External links
 Yale Law School: John Fabian Witt 
 

Yale Law School faculty
Living people
Yale Law School alumni
21st-century American historians
21st-century American male writers
Columbia University faculty
Year of birth missing (living people)
Bancroft Prize winners
American male non-fiction writers